Tamás Kenderesi (born 13 December 1996) is a Hungarian competitive swimmer who specializes in butterfly. He is an Olympics and European Championships bronze medalist, and Youth Olympics gold medalist swimmer.

He was born in Bonyhad, but his family is from Aparhant in Tolna county. His mother is a teacher, his father is a toolmaker/entrepreneur. Kenderesi is the oldest child with 3 younger brothers. He started swimming in Pecs under coach, Imre Tari. His current club is the Pecsi Sport Nonprofit.

Kenderesi is studying at the University of Pecs with a major in coaching. After his swimming career ends he wants to be a swimming coach and be as successful as in swimming.

Career
In 2014 he won a gold medal in the 200 meter butterfly on the European Junior Swimming Championships, in Dordrecht.  Later in 2014, Kenderesi swam at the Summer Youth Olympics in Nanjing, China. He placed 7th in the 100 meter butterfly and he won the 200 meter butterfly.

Kenderesi missed the 2015 World Aquatics Championships due to illness and he had to miss 3 months of practicing. Later the same year he swam at the European Short Course Championships which took place in Netanya, Israel, where he got 35th in the 100 meter butterfly and 9th in the 200 meter butterfly.

At the 2016 Summer Olympics in Rio de Janeiro, he qualified in first place for the semifinals in the 200 m butterfly, in which he qualified first for the final with a time of 1:53.96. He won the bronze medal with a time of 1:53.62.

In 2017 Kenderesi qualified for the 17th FINA World Championships, in Budapest where he placed 4th in the 200 meter butterfly. In December 2017 he won a bronze medal at the European Short Course Championships in Copenhagen, Denmark in the 200 meter butterfly.

2019 sexual misconduct incident
Kenderesi was widely publicized in 2019 for an incident in South Korea that involved allegations of sexual misconduct. He was briefly banned from leaving South Korea at the conclusion of the 2019 World Aquatics Championships, after he was accused of committing an indecent act by compulsion in a night club. Kenderesi received a written warning from the Swimming Association and six month cancellation of benefits.

Awards
  Cross of Merit of Hungary – Golden Cross (2016)

References

External links 
 
 
 
 
 

1996 births
Living people
Sportspeople from Tolna County
Hungarian male swimmers
Male butterfly swimmers
Olympic swimmers of Hungary
Swimmers at the 2016 Summer Olympics
European Aquatics Championships medalists in swimming
Swimmers at the 2014 Summer Youth Olympics
Olympic bronze medalists for Hungary
Olympic bronze medalists in swimming
Medalists at the 2016 Summer Olympics
Youth Olympic gold medalists for Hungary
Swimmers at the 2020 Summer Olympics
20th-century Hungarian people
21st-century Hungarian people